The 2013 World Judo Juniors Championships was an edition of the World Judo Juniors Championships, organised by the International Judo Federation. It was held in Ljubljana, Slovenia from 24 to 27 October 2013. The final day of competition featured men's and women's team events. The men's event was won by team Georgia and the Women's by team Japan.

Medal summary

Men's events

Women's events

Source Results

Medal table

References

External links
 

World Judo Junior Championships
 U21
World Championships, U21
World Championships, U21
Judo
Judo competitions in Slovenia
Judo
Judo, World Championships U21